Peter Rutley (born 19 May 1946) is an English former professional footballer who played in the Football League as a right half.

References

1946 births
Living people
Sportspeople from Exeter
Footballers from Devon
English footballers
Exeter City F.C. players
Leicester City F.C. players
Wimbledon F.C. players
Poole Town F.C. players
Margate F.C. players
English Football League players
Association football defenders